Area is a monotypic snout moth genus. It was described by Émile Louis Ragonot in 1891, and contains the species Area diaphanalis. It is found in Argentina (it was described from Goya).

References

Moths described in 1891
Chrysauginae
Moths of South America